Aishihik (Also known as Äshèyi) is a village of the Southern Tutchone  people at the north end of Äshèyi Män (Aishihik Lake) in Yukon. It continues to be the home of the  Äshèyi people. Champagne and Aishihik First Nations continue to use it for traditional purposes

A military airfield was established here during World War II as part of the Northwest Staging Route. It was operated until 1968, and the withdrawal of military service led to the community's depopulation, except for a small number of Champagne and Aishihik First Nations people.

Climate 
Aishihik has a subarctic climate (Köppen climate classification Dfc).

References

External links
Champagne and Aishihik First Nations web site

Indian settlements in Yukon
Southern Tutchone